Nathaniel Parker (born 18 May 1962) is an English stage and screen actor best known for playing the lead in the BBC crime drama series The Inspector Lynley Mysteries, and Agravaine de Bois in the fourth series of Merlin.

Early life
Nathaniel Parker was born in London, the youngest son of the businessman and one-time British Rail chairman Sir Peter Parker and Jillian, a GP and gardener, who wrote The Purest of Pleasures: Creation of a Romantic Garden. He has two older brothers, Alan, chairman of Brunswick Group, and Oliver Parker, a film director, and a sister, Lucy. Parker joined the National Youth Theatre, and after training at the London Academy of Music and Dramatic Art, became a member of the Royal Shakespeare Company in 1986.

Career

Stage
Parker portrayed Bassanio in Peter Hall's 1989 production of The Merchant of Venice in London and on Broadway, co-starring with Dustin Hoffman.

In 2000, he played Bob in Rupert Goold's West End revival of David Mamet's Speed-the-Plow.

Parker returned to the stage in 2013 for the production of The Audience, starring Helen Mirren, written by Peter Morgan and directed by Stephen Daldry. The play ran for four months at the Gielgud Theatre in London. It was also transmitted worldwide via National Theatre Live and was seen by more than 110,000 viewers in the UK and USA.

Parker played King Henry VIII in Wolf Hall (and Bring up the Bodies) for the Royal Shakespeare Company in 2014, earning a 2015 Laurence Olivier Award for Best Actor in a Supporting Role for the London production and appearing in New York City when the show moved on to Broadway, where his performance received a Tony Award nomination. He reprised the role at the Gielgud Theatre in 2021 for The Mirror and the Light, the third and final part of the trilogy.

Parker played Jack Weatherill in James Graham's This House at the Minerva Theatre, Chichester in September 2016 and took the same role to the Garrick Theatre in the West End of London on 19 November 2016.

Film and television
In 1989, Parker portrayed Jamie Jasper in the tenth episode of Inspector Morse. In 1997, he portrayed King David in a made-for-TV film. 

Parker played a variety of television costume drama roles, such as: Martin Jordan in the 1995 TV production of Joanna Trollope's A Village Affair, Gabriel Oak in the Granada/WGBH-TV co- production of Far From the Madding Crowd (1997), and Martin Tanley in the comedy film Beverly Hills Ninja (1997) with Chris Farley and Chris Rock. He also played Rawdon Crawley in a BBC version of Vanity Fair (1998). The New York Times reviewer Caryn James said of his performance: "More than anyone else in the series, Nathaniel Parker brings some complexity to his character." He also played Harold Skimpole in the BAFTA-winning BBC1 dramatisation of Bleak House (2005).

In a 2007 Radio Times interview, Parker said that his first big television break came in 1988 when he played a Battle of France pilot in ITV's six-part drama Piece of Cake. 
Another early role was Wilfred Owen in Derek Jarman's War Requiem, a 1989 film adaptation of Benjamin Britten's War Requiem. It co-starred Laurence Olivier, in his last screen role, as an old soldier. Four years later, Parker played Edward Rochester in John Duigan's 1993 film adaptation of Jean Rhys' Wide Sargasso Sea. Reviewing this 'prequel' to Jane Eyre, Vincent Canby said in his review that Parker: "is exceptionally good in a difficult, shadowy role".

From 2001 to 2007, Parker played the titular character in the long-running BBC1 crime series The Inspector Lynley Mysteries, perhaps his best-known role. His co-star was Sharon Small as his assistant, Detective Sergeant Barbara Havers. When the series premiered on PBS in 2002, The Wall Street Journal wrote that it was "fully worthy of the Mystery! label." At the same time, he played Master Gracey in The Haunted Mansion,(2003), Albert Speer in the BBC production of 2006 Nuremberg: Nazis on Trial and Dunstan Thorn in the fantasy film Stardust (2007). Parker also starred briefly in St Trinian's (directed by his brother, Oliver).

In 2011, Parker joined the cast of Merlin, to play the character of Agravaine de Bois for all 13 episodes of the fourth series. He also appeared in the independent comedy-drama The Perfect Host, alongside David Hyde Pierce.

In 2012, Parker was cast alongside YouTube reviewer Stuart Ashen in the Alienware-sponsored sci-fi thriller series The Proxy. He also appeared as Chief Inspector Armand Gamache of the Sûreté du Québec in the film adaptation of Louise Penny's murder mystery novel Still Life, set in rural Quebec. He also starred in the TV series, Me and Mrs Jones broadcast in 2012.

In July 2015, Parker played the domestic bully Dicky Carmichael in the BBC's two-part television adaptation of Sadie Jones’ debut novel The Outcast. In June 2015 it was announced that Parker would play the role of King Achish in ABC TVs series Of Kings and Prophets.

Audio and voiceover work
Parker is a voiceover artist and has done work on audiobooks, including Eoin Colfer's children's Artemis Fowl series, the five books in Charlie Higson's Young James Bond series, and The Gardens of The Dead by William Brodrick. He read Mark Haddon's novel A Spot of Bother for BBC Radio Four's Book at Bedtime and played Axel in Jules Verne's Journey to the Centre of the Earth, first broadcast on BBC Radio Four Extra on 20 November 2011 and again on 12 November 2012. He has also voiced numerous video games and made many radio appearances as an interviewee and in radio dramas. A complete listing of Parker's extensive audio work can be found online.

Personal life
Parker is married to actress Anna Patrick. The couple live in Gloucestershire with their two daughters.

Filmography

Film

Television

Theatre work
Unless noted otherwise, details of Parker's theatre work can be found here.

References

External links

1962 births
Alumni of the London Academy of Music and Dramatic Art
English male film actors
English male television actors
Living people
People educated at Leighton Park School
National Youth Theatre members
Male actors from London
Royal Shakespeare Company members
Audiobook narrators
Laurence Olivier Award winners
21st-century English male actors
20th-century English male actors
English male stage actors